Douglas Felipe Moreira Cobo (born March 19, 1987), more commonly known as Douglas Cobo, is a Brazilian professional footballer, currently playing for Songkhla in the Thai League 3

External links
 

1987 births
Living people
Brazilian footballers
Association football central defenders
Douglas Cobo
Douglas Cobo
Douglas Cobo
Douglas Cobo
Floriana F.C. players
Douglas Cobo
Douglas Cobo
Brazilian expatriate sportspeople in Thailand
Expatriate footballers in Thailand
Maltese Premier League players
Brazilian expatriates in Malta
Expatriate footballers in Malta
Association football forwards
People from Assis